Tietgen is a surname. Notable people with the surname include:
 Carl Frederik Tietgen (1829–1901), Danish financier and industrialist
 SS C.F. Tietgen, ship named after the merchant
 Lane Tietgen, American poet, composer and musician